The Miles House is a historic building located at 631 Woodland Street in Nashville, Tennessee
It was added to the National Register of Historic Places on January 8, 1978.
Since 1978 the Miles House has been cared for by Phillip Miller and is currently home to the Miller Law Offices.

History 
The Miles House has withstood Nashville's Great Fire of 1916 and a tornado in 1998. When first built prior to the civil war the building was a private residence, but was converted to a private girls school to serve the wealthy neighborhood of Edgefield.

See also 
 National Register of Historic Places listings in Davidson County, Tennessee

References 

Houses on the National Register of Historic Places in Tennessee
Houses in Nashville, Tennessee
National Register of Historic Places in Nashville, Tennessee